A kiln is a thermally insulated chamber, a type of oven.

Kiln or KILN may also refer to:

Arts and entertainment
 Kiln (band), an American ambient music trio
 "Kiln" (poem), an Ancient Greek poem
 The Kiln, a 1996 novel by William McIlvanney
 KILN-LP (99.1 FM), a radio station in Alturas, California, US

Places
 Kiln, Iran
 Kiln, Mississippi, US
 Wilmington Air Park (ICAO code), Wilmington, Ohio, US
 Kiln Theatre, a theatre in Kilburn, London Borough of Brent, England
 The Kilns, a house in Risinghurst, Oxford, England, owned by C.S. Lewis

See also
 Kyln, a fictional prison in the Marvel Universe